"Symmetry" is a song by Australian singer Gabriella Cilmi. It was released as the second single from her third studio album The Sting on 11 November 2013 on digital download format. "Symmetry" was co-written by Tom Fuller.

A music video was released on 17 September, it was directed by Tim Fox, who also directed Zico Chain's "New Romantic". The video features Cilmi and a long-haired actor in a space other-worldly atmosphere that reminds us of her Ten lead single "On a Mission".

Music video
About the music video, released on 17 November 2013, director Tim Fox said: "The song Symmetry is about two people becoming so symbiotic they start to mirror each other. I didn't want to do the obvious of using a mirror/kaleidoscope effect on everything, so instead we followed the theme of planets and things aligning. The song takes place under the ominous presence of a black hole its dark forces pulling everything together.

"We used a few hands-on, DIY effects such as waving pieces of cloth around Gabriella – me and the crew are just off screen waving them frantically! We also used a projector to align a projection of Gabriella singing onto Gabriella – it took a bit of explaining but you'll understand when you see it."

Release history

References

2013 singles
Gabriella Cilmi songs
2013 songs
Songs written by Gabriella Cilmi